Rosa Papier, married name Paumgartner (18 September 1859 in Baden bei Wien – 9 February 1932 in Vienna) was an Austrian operatic soprano and vocal teacher.

Further reading 
 Ludwig Eisenberg: Großes biographisches Lexikon der Deutschen Bühne im XIX. Jahrhundert. Paul List publishing house, Leipzig 1903,
 
 Helmut Brenner, Reinhold Kubik: Mahlers Menschen. Freunde und Weggefährten. Residenz-Verlag, St. Pölten, 2014, .

References

External links 

 
 
 

1859 births
1932 deaths
Musicians from Baden bei Wien
Austrian operatic mezzo-sopranos
Voice teachers